The  is a yōkai of a "prophecy beast" type, whose news or urban legend has been disseminated in Japan since the Edo Period.

The human-faced, bovine-bodied kudan that allegedly appeared in "Mount Kurahashi", Tango Province (in today's Kyoto Prefecture) in the year Tenpō 7 (1836) was reported in a contemporary . It predicted bountiful harvest in the ensuing years, and instructed people to paste up the picture image of itself for the home to ward off evil and prosper. The kawarabans claim that the stock phrase "kudan no gotoshi" ("as in the case/matter in question") which frequently appeared at the end of certificates/deeds, was actually a reference to this monster is considered spurious.

The variant kutabe (or kudabe, kutahe) allegedly appeared in Mount Tate, Etchū Province (Toyama Prefecture), datable to Bunsei 10 (1827).

Etymology

This breakdown of the kanji ideogram is even stated on the woodblock print leaflet example. and also discussed by novelist Hyakken Uchida in his story "Kudan".

Phraseology 
Throughout Japan, the idiom  began to appear on deeds and official documents. The phrase simply means 'As in the case [at hand]', though a meaning "on the truth of the Kudan", invoking the monster has also been alleged. However while the kudan monster dates to the late Edo Period, the idiom is much older, dating to the Heian period, so the relationship between the phrase and the monster  has been refuted as an anachronism.

General description

Iconography 
The kudan is generally depicted as having the head of a human and the body of a bovine. The kudan is recorded as being  in an early attestation from a samurai scribe's diary (Bunsei 2, year 1819)

This kawaraban (single-sheet woodblock-print newspaper, a broadside) is actually visibly printed on a piece of wood.

The ,  altitude, in Miyazu, west of the Amanohashidate scenic monument fits the location.

There have also survived hand-copied documents which replicated kudan's picture and text from a kawaraban. Another hand-copied example on paper manuscript has belonged to the family based in  village (now part of Saku, Nagano).

The news of the monster called by the variant names of kutabe, kudabe, etc. (cf. § Kutabe below) were disseminated in Bunsei 10–12 (1827–1829), and it was claimed that its human encounter occurred on Mount Tate, in present-day Toyama Prefecture. Many of the kutabe/kudabe illustrations bear long-haired woman-like faces according to scholars, but may also have a head like a bald old man and may not manifest bovine features, and have sharp claws. While some pictures have eyes on their bodies, like the luck beast Bai ze (Hakuaku).

Tales of cow-headed women or ushi-onna  also became urban legend from around the time of World War II.

Prophesy beast 

The kudan is typical of the so-called  of Japanese folklore, which not only portend plague or bounty, but prescribe the method on how to avoid being stricken. Typically the prophecy beast instructs people to view a picture image of itself, or to copy it to ward off evil luck, and the kutabe/kudabe group of variant follow that norm.

The aforementioned artefact dated Tenpo7/1836 (referred to as a kawaraban example), which is entitled "A beast called kudan which lets known great bountiful harvests", and goes onto say "If one paste up this picture image, the home inside shall flourish and not receive calamity&disease, all misfortune whatsoever shall be averted, and a great bumper-crop harvest shall ensue; it is a truly propitious beast". At this time, the Tenpō famine was at its peak, and so it is believed that this report was intended to "give people hope of a good harvest".

This same artefact also claims that a past appearance of the kudan, in the 12th month of Hōei 2/1705, recorded in an ancient document.

The kutabe variants only portent evil (epidemic), and are not known to predict blessings of bountiful harvest, unlike most prophesy beasts.

In a late example, the  kudan was rumoured to have predicted Japan's defeat during World War II. There were also rumours among Japanese immigrant population in Brazil about a  predicting that Japan would emerge victorious.

Born as calf 
An early attestation of kudan occurs in the aforementioned  dated to Bunsei 2 (1819), where a human language-speaking and human-headed calf declared it should be given the name "kudan".

The multicolor woodblock-print (nishiki-e) entitled  dated to the very end of the Edo Period (Keiō 3/1867), also reports that a kudan born from a cow, after speaking out its prophecy, dies as a 3-day old newborn. although later write more approximately.

After the shogunate ended and the Meiji era began, the kudan was still mentioned in writings and Lafcadio Hearn heard about travelling showmen displaying an alleged stuffed specimen of a kudan.

In the Taisho era, novelist Hyakken Uchida published a short novel entitled Kudan (1921), where it is stated "the kudan dies 3 days after birth, and in the meanwhile, in the language of humans, it prognosticates the ill or good luck of the future 

Dating to the Shōwa era, the kudan is listed in a dictionary of the folklore of Okayama Prefecture, as well as in the writings of Kunio Yanagita who originates from the adjacent Hyogo Prefecture. The kudan is described as a strange beast born from a cow, or allegedly born as a cross between cattle and human, capable of human speech, and dies within a few days of birth. Meanwhiled, it prophesizes the advent of various grave occurrences, such as crop failure, epidemic, drought, or war. which reputedly come to pass without fail. Instances of kudan given birth by cattle in the Kansai region have been reported in the postwar period.

Calves born with certain illness deformities can give the impression of human-like face features, which could explain reports of kudan birth in some cases, according to some writers.

Kutabe 

The kutabe or kudabe is considered an equivalent (subclass) of the kudan, though kutabe's legend is set specifically in Tateyama in Etchū Province (Mount Tate, in today's Toyama Prefecture). The news of the kutabe or kudabe were circulated in the years Bunsei 10–12 (1827–1829) when its appearances was supposedly witnessed.

The kanji-titled pamphlet claims that 件 (here presumably pronounced "ken" rather than "kudan") is actually its Chinese name, while kutabe is the true Japanese name.

Nomenclature 

Iconography of the kutabe 
The kutabe/kudabe group illustrations appear to scholars as having long-haired woman-like face, while others have the head of a bald old man, or with resemblance to a "fatigued medical monk's body", and lack obvious discernible bovine features, but and are given front and hind paws with sharp claws (rather than hooves).

Prophecy and warding 

The prophecies and the instructions to ward off evil are nearly identical in the various attestations of the kutabe group; the prophecy beast warns of an outbreak of some unknown disease in 4, 5 years time, and instructs that an individual must view the image of the creature once, in order to avoid the catastrophe.

The "gudabe" example (in the French collection) prescribes that in addition to viewing the image of itself, if an individual gathers seven-colored herbs, pound them into mochi (rice cake) and eats them, the wonders it would do will be "like unto a god".

Comparison to Hakutaku
A comparison study of some 7 examples of the "kutabe" subclass was conducted by Hitomi Hosokawa, who addresses some of the origin questions; the questions of have been pursued by others also (cf. §Origins). The origins of the "kutabe" subclass has been discussed by Hosoki Regarding whether the kutabe could have originated from the Bai Ze (Hakutaku), she found mixed results in comparing their physical depictions/ And as curator of the museum at Tateyama, she concluded that the kutabe sub-legend never developed locally, but was probably invented by outsiders residing in other provinces.

Origins 

The kudan may derive from the Chinese luck beast Bai Ze (pronounced "Hakutaku" in Japanese), as has been formally theorized by sociologist  (1995, Kudan no tanjō [The Birth of Kudan]). The custom of distributing the image of Bai Ze existed in Edo Period Japan, and its iconography was likely borrowed to create the kudan creature.

The traditional Chinese Bai Ze actually tended to be depicted as more beastlike, or "tiger-faced, scaly-bodied" to be more specific. But in Japan, it later became more commonplace for the Bai Ze (Hakutaku) to be drawn or painted as human-faced and beast-bodied, hence not much different in appearance from the kudan which emerged.

Jinjahime and Hakutaku origins 
It has been pointed out that the jinjahime that manifested itself in Bunsei 2(1819) gave instructions on how to avoid the foretold doom, like the kudan in later documents, but whether the kudan of Bunsei 2 did so is inconclusive.

Another proponent who equated the kutabe with the luck beast Hakutaku (Bai Ze) was the famous yōkaimanga author Shigeru Mizuki, who viewed kutabe as a "human-faced bovine, with eyes on both flanks of its belly", just like Hakutaku. This is somewhat disputed by Hosoki, since the kutabe does indeed have eyes on its body, but they are situated on its back (next to spine), if the woodblock-printed image is taken to be authoritative. But at any rate this is coincidence enough to conclude that the iconography of the kutabe was influenced by Hakutaku amulets.

Mizuki also saw some connection between the medicine god Yellow Emperor meeting Bai Ze/Hakutaku and the supposed  meeting the kudan in Mount Tate of Toyama. But Hosoki does not find this connection to the "patron god of Traditional Chinese medicine" to be persuasive enough to demonstrate equivalence.

Although the kutabe legend situates the encounter in Mount Tate, Toyama, Hosokawa found no evidence that the legend was being told locally, having consulted various temples connected with the mountain, and examining the writings left by pilgrims preserved at these establishments. The  mentioned in the legend also appears to be spurious. Thus she concludes this legend to have been concocted by an outsider, who wanted to exploit the reputation all over Japan that Mount Tate was a mystic place where rare or potent medicinal ingredients could be found.

Ushi-onna

Mimei Ogawa published a short novel called "Ushi-onna" ('cow-woman', 1919), probably having read the Hyakken's story  "Kudan".

Sakyo Komatsu also wrote a piece of fiction entitled  (1968), which was also probably based on the knowledge of Hyakken's story, and on further collected folkloric material. Komatsu's story is thought to have significantly influenced the furtherance of the ushi-onna urban legend in Japan.

The ushi-onna lore was circulated particularly in the vicinity of city of Kobe, namely the  Nishinomiya and Mount Kabuto areas in Hyogo Prefecture, and it was rumored that the ushi-onna was seen devouring animal carcasses in the airstruck ruins. And after the entire corridor from Ashiya to Nishinomiya got devastated by air bombings, there floated a rumor that an ushi-onna loitered the butcher's house that was burned down and in ruins, the daughter of the family who was kept sequestered in a  room, away from the eyes of the public.

The writer  argues that the kudan and the ushi-onna ought to be distinguished, due to a number of differences: the kudan is a calf born from cattle, the ushi-onna is a daughter of human parents; the kudan is human-faced and bovine-bodies, the ushi-onna the other way around; the kudan is actually the one capable of human speech, whereas the cow-woman's ability to speak is unattested.

Chronology

From the Edo period through Shōwa period, there have been several reported sightings throughout Japan, though they are most often reported in Western Japan.

Edo period
The kudan allegedly appeared as early as the 12th month of Hōei 2 (1705) according to "old documents", but this is only purported by the kawaraban of 1836, and not verified by contemporary evidence.

An early attestation that a calf proclaiming itself to be a kudan was born at a commoner's cow in Kaminoseki, Suō Province is recorded in the  diary called , the entry dated to Bunsei 2, 5th month, 13th day (4 July 1819). The creature was capable of human speech, and instructed that it should be given the name "kudan", and it should not be slaughtered on account of its odd form. It predicted 7 consecutive years of bountiful harvest, but war trouble on the 8th year.

The attestations to the "kutabe" or "kudabe" group date to Bunsei 10–12 (1827–1829), as already discussed. The kutabe/kudabe were allegedly witnessed on Mount Tate, Toyama in the north, but the source material were discovered in places like Osaka or Nagoya.

The news of a "kutabe", after a time gap, is attested from the Kaei era (1848–1854), according to Nagano; the surimono (wood-block print) of the "kutabe" written in kanji is itself undated, but is pasted into the scrapbook called Hogochō, which began to be compiled in the year Kaei 4 (1851).

Meiji Restoration onward 
On June 21, 1909, a Nagoya newspaper reported a sighting of the kudan. According to the article, a calf had been born with a human face a decade before in a farmhouse on the Gotō Islands. It reported that "It died only 31 days after its birth and prophesied a war between Japan and Russia." The calf was later stuffed and put on display in the Yahiro Museum in Nagasaki. The museum has since closed and the calf's whereabouts are unknown.

From the Meiji period onward, stuffed carcasses of cattle and swine purported to be kudan" were being exhibited at "spectacle show shacks". Lafcadio Hearn (Glimpses of Unfamiliar Japan, vol. 2, 1894) recorded the incident in 1892 about a travelling showmen who brought a stuffed kudan aboard a ship bound for Mihonoseki. Their unholy conduct of transporting the  kudan, a tiger  and other dead animals was blamed by the priest for the sudden squall, which forced the ship to abandon disembarking at Mihonoseki and turn back.

The theory about the kudan being a benevolent wish-granting creature subsided during the Shōwa period and was replaced by greater emphasis on the kudan's wartime prophecies. A kudan appeared in 1930 in a forest in Kagawa Prefecture, prophesying: "Soon, there will be a great war. You shall win, but you will later be struck down by plague. However, those who eat red beans and tie yarn around their wrists within three days of hearing this prophecy shall not fall sick". In 1933, this rumor reached Nagano Prefecture and quickly spread, with elementary school students spreading it further by taking red bean rice (azuki-meshi) into school for their lunches. However, the content of the rumor changed. Instead of a kudan, the prophecy was attributed to a snake-headed beast, sent by the deity of the Suwa Grand Shrine in Nagano Prefecture.

A rumour of a kudan birth in Hirado, Nagasaki in was propagated via Sasebo, and eventually collected in the summer of 1932 in  village in Nishisonogi Peninsula by folklorist Katsunori Sakurada.

During World War II, many rumors were spread about prophecies regarding the war and air raids. In 1943, a kudan was said to have been born in a geta shop in Iwakuni. This kudan predicted that "the war will end next year, around April or May." It was then reported in the spring of 1945 in Matsuyama that "A Kudan has been born in Kobe. He says that 'anyone who consumes red beans or bean cakes within three days of hearing this tale shall escape the air raids.'" The rumors quickly circulated throughout Matsuyama.

Around early 1944 in the area of Marília, Brazil, there spread a rumour among the Japanese immigrants that a human headed and beast-bodied  was born, which predicted that the "war will end within the year with the Axis powers winning great vicotory"; it supposedly died immediately after speaking the stock phrase "yotte kudan no gotoshi". This has been characterized as the burgeoning of the denialist logic of espoused by the  group who refused to believe Japan could lose a war.

Kudan birth anecdotes have also been heard in the villages that produce the  brand of Kobe beef (published 1953).

Media appearances

Literature
 Kudan, a collection of short stories by Hyakken Uchida
 Kudan Monster by Rin Adashino
 The Kudan's Mother by Sakyo Komatsu
 Would you Like to Talk About Kudan? by Yasujirō Uchiyama
 , short story by Shimako Iwai

Manga
 GeGeGe no Kitarō Jigoku Sensei Nūbē (Vol. 11, Ch. 93)
 Tsubasa: Reservoir Chronicle (Vol. 2)
 Nijigahara Holograph Pet Shop of Horrors: Tokyo (Vol. 11, Ch. 39)
 Kudan no GotoshiKyokou SuiriMovies
 The Great Yokai WarVideo games
 Aoi Shiro Hayarigami 3 Kamaitachi no Yoru 2: Song of the Prison Island Segare Ijiri Shining Force III Shin Megami Tensei: Devil Summoner: Raidou Kuzunoha vs. The Soulless Army Toppa-ra: Zashiki Warashi no wa Nashi Yo-Kai Watch 2 – the English dub calls him by the name Predictabull''

Explanatory notes

References
Citations

Bibliography

 
 
  (English abstract)
 
 
 
 
 
 
  

Japanese mythology
Yōkai
Mythological tricksters
Prophecy
Human-headed mythical creatures
Edo period